E Fund Management (Hong Kong) Co., Limited is a Hong Kong-based asset management company, and a subsidiary of E Fund Management Co., Ltd, established in Guangzhou China in 2001. E Fund Management Co., Ltd currently manages US$223 billion as of March 31, 2020. As of 2015, it is licensed by the Securities and Futures Commission of Hong Kong and the U.S. Securities and Exchange Commission It is also licensed RQFII and QFII investor.

Its parent company E Fund Management Co., Ltd. is claiming compliance with the GIPS Standards and is China’s largest non-MMF asset manager.

It is a member of Hong Kong Investment Funds Association, the Investment Company Institute (ICI Global), Chinese Asset Management Association of Hong Kong,  Chinese Securities Association of Hong Kong and Hong Kong Institute of Human Resource Management. It is also supporting organisation of Insurance Asset Management Association of China.

The company has listed its ETFs and Leveraged and Inverse ETF in Hong Kong Exchanges and Clearing, NYSE Arca, Amsterdam Stock Exchange, Borsa Italiana and London Stock Exchange. In addition, it has also registered its funds as Foreign investment funds authorized to be marketed and sold in Macau and Restricted Schemes to be marketed and sold in Singapore.

Awards and recognition 
The HKMA and the Shenzhen Municipal Financial Regulatory Bureau jointly organized the Shenzhen-Hong Kong Fintech Award 2019 to recognize and reward outstanding fintech products and solutions from both places. The firm was awarded 2nd prize under Award A - Shenzhen-Hong Kong Financial Collaborative Innovation Award with a fintech project named E Fund "Platform Alpha" Cross Border & Global Asset Management System.

E Fund ETFs 
 E Fund ETFs Trust - E Fund CSI 100 A-Share Index ETF
 E Fund ETFs Trust - E Fund CES China 120 Index ETF
 E Fund ETFs Trust - E Fund FTSE Chinese Government Bond 5-10 Years Index ETF
 L&G-E Fund MSCI China A GO UCITS ETF
 KraneShares E Fund China Commercial Paper ETF()

E Fund Leveraged and Inverse ETFs 
 E Fund Yuanta Hang Seng Index Daily (-1x) Inverse Product
 E Fund Yuanta Hang Seng Index Daily (2x) Leveraged Product

References 

Investment companies of Hong Kong